Deserticossus consobrinus is a moth in the family Cossidae. It was described by Püngeler in 1898. It is found in China (Xinjiang)., southern Siberia, Mongolia, Kazakhstan and Kirghizistan.

The length of the forewings is 17–23 mm for males and 21–26 mm for females. Adults are on wing from June to August.

References

Natural History Museum Lepidoptera generic names catalog

Cossinae
Moths described in 1898
Moths of Asia